Everaldo Paes de Lima (14 March 1918 – 27 July 1964), better known as Vevé, was a Brazilian footballer. He played in one match for the Brazil national football team in 1945. He was also part of Brazil's squad for the 1945 South American Championship.

References

1918 births
1964 deaths
Brazilian footballers
Brazil international footballers
Place of birth missing
Association football forwards
Sportspeople from Belém